Racing de Micomeseng is a football club from Equatorial Guinea. They won their first domestic league title in 2015, qualifying for 2016 CAF Champions League in the process.

Notable players

References

Football clubs in Equatorial Guinea
Bata, Equatorial Guinea